Butgram is a small city located in Khyber Pakhtunkhwa, Pakistan. Butgram was heavily damaged during the Kashmir earthquake.

Populated places in Khyber Pakhtunkhwa
2005 Kashmir earthquake